Pomacea aurostoma is a South American species of freshwater snail with gills and an operculum, an aquatic gastropod mollusc in the family Ampullariidae, the apple snails.

Distribution
The native distribution of P. aurostoma is Colombia and Venezuela.

References

aurostoma
Molluscs of South America
Invertebrates of Colombia
Invertebrates of Venezuela
Gastropods described in 1856